Bittersweet July is the second extended play (EP) by American recording artist Dev, released on September 23, 2014 by her own record label Rica Lyfe Records. It is her first project released since her debut studio album The Night the Sun Came Up (2011). Dev worked mainly with NanosauR, followed by Benny Cassette and Peter Wade (MNDR). "Honey Dip" was released as the lead single from Bittersweet July on November 5, 2014.

The EP was followed by a second part, Bittersweet July, Pt. 2, released on December 15, 2014. The two EPs will subsequently put together in one album.

Composition
Bittersweet July is primarily an electropop EP, which incorporates influences of several different genres such as hip hop, dance music and electronica.

The EP starts with the first single "Honey Dip", a synthpop song with rap verses before the chorus, sung with a style called by the critics "talked singing". The next song "Feel It" runs through an electronic tinged house beats mixed with influences of 90s music produced by Peter Wade from MNDR. The third song "Baby, We Go" is an electronic song that contains influences of teen-pop music, about the meaning of the song Dev said "'It's a song about almost losing the chance to be with someone we love. But we realize we're better together than apart." The album's fourth track, "Kids" is an electronic pop song produced by NanosauR whose robotic sound are a strong reminder to the early works of the singer, it was released as the promotional single on August 11, 2014. The fifth track is "Who Needs A Heart", another teen-pop song with influences of dance music.

Track listing

Bittersweet July, Pt. 2 

Bittersweet July, Pt. 2 is the third extended play (EP) by American recording artist Dev, released on December 15, 2014 by Rica Lyfe Records. It serves as a follow up to part 1. Dev this time worked exclusively with NanosauR, who helmed the production of the entire EP. The songs from the EP feature an overall dark appearance (a stark contrast from the first part) and a heavily electronic dance-influenced sound. "Parade" was released as the lead single from Bittersweet July, Pt. 2 on March 24, 2015.

Composition
The EP starts with "You Want Me", a psychedelic electronic song which was defined as a darker, crazier version of "Dark Horse" by Katy Perry. It is followed by "Gimmie Some", an electronic ballad with influences of 1990s music and continuous swinging synth bass produced by Peter Wade of MNDR as well as "Feel It" from part 1. The third track, "Parade", is a rapped song showing low distorted bass similar to those of Dev previous hits Like A G6 and Bass Down Low; it was released as the official single with a video on VEVO on March 24, 2015. "Celebrate The Weekend" is characterized by high sung chorus and a strongly computerized pre-chorus. The last track, "The Night Is Young" is equipped of autotune effects and button-based stems. It was released as the countdown promotional single on December 5, 2014.

Track listing

Charts

Release history

References

2014 EPs